Radio Vorarlberg is the regional radio for Vorarlberg and is part of the Österreich 2 group. It is broadcast by the ORF, and the programs from Radio Vorarlberg are made in the ORF Landesstudio Vorarlberg.

External links 
 

Radio stations in Austria
ORF (broadcaster)
Radio stations established in 1967
1967 establishments in Austria